Global Spin: The Corporate Assault on Environmentalism is a book by Professor Sharon Beder. It was first published in 1997 and there have been subsequent updated editions in 2000 and 2002. The book uses many detailed case studies to build up a "bigger picture" of how large corporations attempt to manipulate environmental issues for their own ends. In the first edition most of the material was from the United States, where the corporate environmental impact has been greatest.

See also
List of Australian environmental books
Unequal Protection: The Rise of Corporate Dominance and the Theft of Human Rights

References

1997 non-fiction books
1997 in the environment
2000 in the environment
2002 in the environment
Environmental non-fiction books
Books about multinational companies
Books by Sharon Beder